Brinkley is a surname. Notable people with the surname include:

 Alan Brinkley (1949–2019), historian
 Amy Woods Brinkley (born c. 1956), businesswoman
 Christie Brinkley (born 1954), model
 David Brinkley (1920–2003), television journalist
 David R. Brinkley (born 1959), Maryland politician
 Don Brinkley, (1921–2012) television writer and producer, adoptive father of Christie
 Douglas Brinkley (born 1960), American author and historian
 Jack Thomas Brinkley (1930–2019), American politician
 Jamel Brinkley, American writer
 Joel Brinkley (1952–2014), New York Times journalist
 John Brinkley (astronomer) (1763–1835), Astronomer Royal of Ireland
 John R. Brinkley (1885–1941), American "goat gland" doctor also known for his radio broadcasts
 Stephen Brinkley (born c. 1550), English printer of the sixteenth century

References 

English-language surnames